James Joseph Mallon (born March 19, 1956) is an American television and film producer and writer, most notable for being executive producer of the Peabody Award-winning series Mystery Science Theater 3000 (MST3K). He is also president of the series' original production company, Best Brains, Inc., directed more than 75 episodes of MST3K, and played the role of Gypsy from the first season until the middle of the eighth season.

Early career and education
A native of Rochester, Minnesota, Mallon began producing television and comedy movies while still in high school, and continued while attending the University of Wisconsin–Madison.

Mallon also produced and directed programs for CBS and PBS affiliates WISC-TV and WHA-TV in Madison and made his feature film debut in 1987 with Blood Hook, distributed worldwide by Troma, Inc.

Mystery Science Theater 3000
In 1986, Mallon became the production manager of a new independent UHF television station, KTMA, in Minneapolis. There Mallon hired future MST3K cohort, Kevin Murphy. In 1988, Mallon met series creator Joel Hodgson and Mystery Science Theater 3000 was born.

As MST3K began to gain national attention, Mallon and Hodgson began to disagree on the future of the series. Hodgson said in a 1999 interview with The A.V. Club that the reason he left the series was due to creative infighting between him and Mallon, presumably over the possibility of a movie based on the series. As a result, Mallon ended up with majority ownership of the program. Mallon later directed Mystery Science Theater 3000: The Movie, released by Gramercy Pictures on April 19, 1996. Due primarily to poor marketing, the film was a box office bomb.

Hodgson regained control of the MST3K property before a 2017 relaunch on Netflix. Mallon is credited as an original producer in the revival's end credits through both seasons.

References

External links
 

1956 births
Living people
American puppeteers
American television writers
People from Rochester, Minnesota
University of Wisconsin–Madison alumni
Screenwriters from Minnesota
Television producers from Minnesota